Taranaki was a New Zealand parliamentary electorate that existed for three periods between 1881 and 1996. It was represented by nine Members of Parliament.

Population centres
The previous electoral redistribution was undertaken in 1875 for the 1875–1876 election. In the six years since, New Zealand's European population had increased by 65%. In the 1881 electoral redistribution, the House of Representatives increased the number of European representatives to 91 (up from 84 since the 1875–76 election). The number of Māori electorates was held at four. The House further decided that electorates should not have more than one representative, which led to 35 new electorates being formed, including Taranaki, and two electorates that had previously been abolished to be recreated. This necessitated a major disruption to existing boundaries.

The original area included the townships of Ohura, Waitara, and Inglewood. The Mokau River was used as the northern boundary. In the 1887 electoral redistribution, the northern boundary moved north, most of it as yet unsurveyed land. The settlements of Mokau and Awakino were included in the newly gained area to the north, and Stratford was gained in the south.

In the 1896 electoral redistribution, rapid population growth in the North Island required the transfer of three seats from the South Island to the north. Four electorates that previously existed were re-established, including Taranaki, and three electorates were established for the first time. The  electorate was abolished, the  electorate shifted north, and the  electorate shifted east.

History
The electorate existed from 1881 to 1890, from 1896 to 1928, and from 1978 (replacing Stratford) to 1996. In 1996 it was combined with the adjacent King Country to form the Taranaki-King Country electorate.

The first representative was Robert Trimble from 1881 to 1887, who had earlier represented Grey and Bell. The second representative was George Marchant.

Members of Parliament
Taranaki was represented by nine Members of Parliament.

Key

Election results

1925 election

1918 by-election

1907 by-election

1899 election

Notes

References

Historical electorates of New Zealand
Politics of Taranaki
1881 establishments in New Zealand
1896 establishments in New Zealand
1978 establishments in New Zealand
1890 disestablishments in New Zealand
1928 disestablishments in New Zealand
1996 disestablishments in New Zealand